Jalan Mahang–Selama, Federal Route 170 (formerly Kedah state route K187), is a federal road in Kedah, Malaysia.

Features
At most sections, the Federal Route 170 was built under the JKR R5 road standard, allowing maximum speed limit of up to

List of junctions

References

Malaysian Federal Roads